Phaendin Thong railway station is a railway station located in Nong Yai To Subdistrict, Chai Badan District, Lopburi Province.

References 

Railway stations in Thailand
Lopburi province